Leucanopsis pulverulenta is a moth of the family Erebidae. It was described by Paul Dognin in 1923. It is found in Brazil.

References

pulverulenta
Moths described in 1923